The Latin Grammy Award for Best Singer-Songwriter Album is an honor presented annually at the Latin Grammy Awards, a ceremony that recognizes excellence and creates a wider awareness of cultural diversity and contributions of Latin recording artists in the United States and internationally. According to the category description guide for the 13th Latin Grammy Awards, the award is reserved for solo artists or duos and they "must compose and interpret 75 percent of the album on their own to be eligible in this category". Additionally, live albums are eligible if they contain at least 51 percent of new unreleased material released within the eligibility period.

The accolade for Best Singer-Songwriter Album was first presented to American performer and musician Soraya at the 5th Latin Grammy Awards in 2004 for her eponymous fourth studio album (2003). Peruvian singer-songwriter Gian Marco, Uruguayan singer-songwriter Jorge Drexler and Brazilian singer-songwriter Caetano Veloso hold the record for the most wins in this category, with three. Guatemalan singer Ricardo Arjona has the highest number of nominations without a single win, with four unsuccessful nominations. For the first time in the category's history, in 2011, a tie was declared with the award given to Peruvian artist Gian Marco for Días Nuevos and to Cuban artist Amaury Gutiérrez for Sesiones Intimas.

Winners and nominees

2000s

2010s

2020s

Notes 
 Each year is linked to the article about the Latin Grammy Awards held that year.
 Showing the name of the performer and the nominated album

References 
General

Specific

External links 
Official website of the Latin Grammy Awards

 
Singer-Songwriter Album